"Keep the Home Fires Burning" is a song by The Bluetones, released as the first single from their third album, Science & Nature. It peaked at number 13 on the UK Singles Chart. Its music video was directed by Edgar Wright.

In 2006, the song was included on the band's two-disc compilation album, A Rough Outline: The Singles & B-Sides 95–03. An acoustic U.S.-released version of the song is featured on the second disc.

Track listing
CD1
"Keep the Home Fires Burning"
"Armageddon (Outta Here)" (featuring Matt Lucas)
"The Favourite Son"

CD2
"Keep the Home Fires Burning" 
"Be Careful What You Dream" 
"Please Stop Talking" 
"Keep the Home Fires Burning (enhanced video)"

Cassette
"Keep the Home Fires Burning" 
"Please Stop Talking"

CD Promo 
"Keep the Home Fires Burning (Radio edit)" 
"Keep the Home Fires Burning"

References

 

The Bluetones songs
2000 singles
2000 songs
Songs written by Eds Chesters
Songs written by Adam Devlin
Songs written by Mark Morriss
Songs written by Scott Morriss
Music videos directed by Edgar Wright